"Don't Ask Me to Be Friends" is a song written by Gerry Goffin and Jack Keller, which was released in 1962 by The Everly Brothers. The song spent 7 weeks on the Billboard Hot 100 chart, peaking at No. 48, while reaching No. 16 on Billboard's Middle-Road Singles chart.

Chart performance

Cover versions
The song was covered by Cliff Richard for his 1970 album Tracks 'n Grooves.

References

1962 songs
1962 singles
The Everly Brothers songs
Songs with lyrics by Gerry Goffin
Songs written by Jack Keller (songwriter)
Warner Records singles